"A Rocky Start" is an episode of the BBC sitcom, The Green Green Grass. It was first screened on 16 September 2005, as the second episode of series one.

Synopsis

Having now met the farm manager, Elgin Sparrowhawk, Boycie is now convinced that he is of Gentlemen Farmer material. However, he finds himself reluctant to meet the other staff which he also didn't know existed. Worst of all, he needs to buy some animals but getting some of those won't be a problem... will it?

After Elgin's fantastic idea of getting the bull owner drunk and getting a lower price of around nine thousand pounds, Boycie stills ends up paying more. He ends up paying around eighteen thousand pounds as he got more drunk. He then attempts to return home but Marlene has locked up and Elgin has taken his car keys so it looks like he's going to have a night out in the wild.

The next morning, the bull (Rocky) arrives and Boycie finds himself face to face with it but the staff find out that Rocky is gay.

Episode cast

Production, broadcast and reception

Writing
This episode was written by John Sullivan, writer of Only Fools and Horses. The whole of the first series was written entirely by John Sullivan.

Broadcast
During its original airing, the episode had a viewing audience of 6.34 million, in the 8:30pm timeslot it was shown. This is the same audiences that sitcoms such as My Family attract.

This episode has since been re-run on BBC1, BBC HD and GOLD. The show received one of the highest ratings of the week making it into the top thirty.

DVD release
The UK DVD release was released on 23 October 2006. The release includes the 2005 Christmas Special, a short special entitled 'Grass Roots' and a short documentary on 'Rocky'.

Continuity
A reference to Uncle Albert is made.
Brief references are made by both Boycie and Marlene regarding their lives in Peckham.

Conception
This episode was designed to introduce the characters of Bryan, Jed and Mrs Cakeworthy – staff that Boycie didn't know existed. The episode works as a set-up that shows the viewers the Boyce's new lives and how their sudden move to Winterdown Farm has affected them. The episode was also needed to introduce Boycie's first animal – Rocky the Bull.

Locations
The Green Green Grass is filmed at two main locations. Teddington Studios is used to film interior scenes whilst John Challis's actual manor house. The surrounding area is also used for filming whilst a local farmer provides the livestock.

Casting
This episode sees the first appearance of Bryan as played by Ivan Kaye. The episode all sees the first appearance of Jed as played by Peter Heppelthwaite and Mrs Cakeworthy as played by Ella Kenion. This episode is the only episode in the first series to only feature the main cast. No guest stars or regulars appear in this episode.

Notes
 This episode marks the first in a story arc spanning several series in the form of the gay bull joke.
 Uncle Albert is mentioned by Boycie.

Errors
 There are no spotted errors within this episode.

References

British TV Comedy Guide for The Green Green Grass
BARB viewing figures
The Green Green Grass at BBC Comedy
The Green Green Grass website
British Sitcom Guide for A Rocky Start
The Green Green Grass at Only Fools and Horses website

2005 British television episodes
The Green Green Grass episodes